Sportverein Höngg is a football club from Zürich. The club was founded in 1941 from a merger of the former Höngg football club and the Talchern sports club and is currently playing in the Swiss 1. Liga.

Players

Staff and board members

 Trainer: Stefan Goll
 Assistant Trainer: Simon Krappl
 Goalkeeper Coach: Guy Huber
 Physio: Bea Rechsteiner
 President: Martin Gubler
 Vice President: Daniel Stein
 Secretary : Walter Söll
 Treasurer : Roger Edelmann

External links
 Official site 

Association football clubs established in 1941
Football clubs in Switzerland
1941 establishments in Switzerland